Repaix is a commune in the Meurthe-et-Moselle department in north-eastern France. In 1999, the village had 84 inhabitants.

It has an Anabaptist graveyard of the 19th century (photo).

See also
Communes of the Meurthe-et-Moselle department

References

Communes of Meurthe-et-Moselle